Kryuchevka is a rural locality (a village) in Russko-Yurmashsky Selsoviet, Ufimsky District, Bashkortostan, Russia. The population was 11 as of 2010. There are 6 streets.

Geography 
Kryuchevka is located 30 km southeast of Ufa (the district's administrative centre) by road. Russky Yurmash is the nearest rural locality.

References 

Rural localities in Ufimsky District